Chet Atkins' discography is large and diverse. Not only did he release principal studio albums as a solo artist, he was a prolific and much sought-after collaborator. He also played as a sideman on many more. His major collaborations were with Hank Snow, Arthur Fiedler and the Boston Pops Orchestra, The Country All-Stars, The Nashville String Band, Jerry Reed, Merle Travis, Doc Watson, Lenny Breau, Les Paul, Mark Knopfler, Suzy Bogguss, Floyd Cramer, Johnny Gimble, and Tommy Emmanuel. He frequently guested on a track or two with other friends. Several of his recordings won or were nominated for Grammy Awards.

The majority of his releases were on the RCA Victor label with many releases on their budget label RCA Camden, in addition to many compilations and anthologies. He left RCA in 1982 after 36 years and signed with Columbia Records.

His discography as a producer encompasses many albums and singles for a wide range of artists. Atkins produced records for Perry Como, Elvis Presley, Eddy Arnold, Don Gibson, Jim Reeves, Jerry Reed, Skeeter Davis, Connie Smith, Waylon Jennings, and many others.

Studio albums

1950s

1960s

1970s
{| class="wikitable plainrowheaders" style="text-align:center;"
|-
! rowspan="2" style="width:22em;"| Title
! rowspan="2" style="width:18em;"| Details
! colspan="2"| Peak chartpositions
|- style="font-size:smaller;"
! width="45"| US Country
! width="45"| US
|-
! scope="row"| Yestergroovin'''
| 
 Release date: 1970
 Label: RCA Victor
| —
| 139
|-
! scope="row"| Solid Gold 70| 
 Release date: 1970
 Label: RCA Victor
| —
| —
|-
! scope="row"| Pickin' My Way| 
 Release date: 1970
 Label: RCA Victor
| 30
| —
|-
! scope="row"| For the Good Times| 
 Release date: 1971
 Label: RCA Victor
| 17
| —
|-
! scope="row"| Picks on the Hits| 
 Release date: 1972
 Label: RCA Victor
| 38
| —
|-
! scope="row"| Alone| 
 Release date: 1973
 Label: RCA Victor
| 42
| —
|-
! scope="row"| Chet Atkins Picks on Jerry Reed 
| 
 Release date: 1974
 Label: RCA Victor
| —
| —
|-
! scope="row"| The Night Atlanta Burned| 
 Release date: 1975
 Label: RCA Victor
| 30
| —
|-
! scope="row"| Chet Atkins Goes to the Movies 
| 
 Release date: 1975
 Label: RCA Victor
| 43
| —
|-
! scope="row"| Teen Scene 
| 
 Release date: 1975
 Label: Pickwick Records
| —
| —
|-
! scope="row"| Me and My Guitar 
| 
 Release date: 1977
 Label: RCA Victor
| 50
| —
|-
| colspan="4" style="font-size: 8pt"| "—" denotes releases that did not chart
|-
|}

1980s–2000s

Collaborations

Live albums

With The Country All-Stars

With The Nashville String Band

Instructional

Compilation albums

Singles

1940s

1950s

1960s

1970s
{| class="wikitable plainrowheaders" style="text-align:center;"
|-
! rowspan="2"| Year
! rowspan="2" style="width:24em;"| Single
! colspan="2"| Peak chartpositions
! rowspan="2"| Album
|- style="font-size:smaller;"
! width="45"| US Country
! width="45"| CAN Country
|-
| rowspan="5"| 1970
! scope="row"| "Difficult"
| —
| —
| align="left"| By Special Request|-
! scope="row"| "Love Beads"
| —
| —
| 
|-
! scope="row"| "Steeplechase Lane"
| —
| —
| align="left"| Yestergroovin|-
! scope="row"| "Strollin'"
| —
| —
| align="left"| Identified
|-
! scope="row"| "Cannonball Rag"
| —
| —
| align="left"| Me & Jerry
|-
| rowspan="4"| 1971
! scope="row"| "Snowbird"
| —
| —
| align="left"| For the Good Times
|-
! scope="row"| "Happy Ending"
| —
| —
| align="left"| Strung Up
|-
! scope="row"| "Black Magic Woman"
| —
| —
| 
|-
! scope="row"| "Jingle Bell Rock"
| —
| —
| align="left"| Christmas
|-
| rowspan="3"| 1972
! scope="row"| "Bandera"
| —
| —
| align="left"| Bandit
|-
! scope="row"| "Red White and Blue Medley"
| —
| —
| 
|-
! scope="row"| "Battle Hymn of Republic"
| —
| —
| align="left"| World's Greatest Melodies
|-
| rowspan="2"| 1973
! scope="row"| "Somewhere My Love"
| —
| —
| 
|-
! scope="row"| "Fiddlin' Around"
| 75
| —
| align="left"| Superpickers
|-
| rowspan="2"| 1974
! scope="row"| "Is Anything Better"
| —
| —
| align="left" rowspan="2" 
|-
! scope="row"| "Dizzy Fingers"
| —
| —
|-
| rowspan="2"| 1975
! scope="row"| "Night Atlanta Burned"
| 77
| —
| align="left"| The Night Atlanta Burned
|-
! scope="row"| "Senora"
| —
| —
| 
|-
| rowspan="3"| 1976
! scope="row"| "Frog Kissin'"
| 40
| 36
| align="left"| Best of Chet Atkins & Friends
|-
! scope="row"| "Moonglow"
| —
| —
| align="left"| Chester & Lester
|-
! scope="row"| "Terry on the Turnpike"
| —
| —
| align="left"| Best of Chet Atkins & Friends
|-
| rowspan="2"| 1977
! scope="row"| "Four in the Morning"
| —
| —
| align="left"| Chet Floyd & Danny
|-
! scope="row"| "Me and My Guitar"
| —
| —
| align="left"| Me and My Guitar
|-
| 1978
! scope="row"| "I'm Your Greatest Fan"
| —
| —
| align="left"| Guitar Monsters
|-
| 1979
! scope="row"| "Love Song of Pepe Sanchez"
| —
| —
| align="left"| First Nashville Guitar Quartet
|-
| colspan="5" style="font-size: 8pt"| "—" denotes releases that did not chart
|-
|}

1980s–1990s

Guest singles

Music videos

Notes

A^' Stay Tuned'' also peaked at number 12 on Top Jazz Albums.

See also
 Inductees of the Country Music Hall of Fame (1973 Inductee)
 Country Music Association

References

External links
 Chet Atkins official website

Country music discographies
Discographies of American artists
Rock music discographies